Vladimir Terentyevich Kashpur (October 26, 1926 – October 17, 2009) was a Russian and Soviet actor. A native of Severka, Altai Krai, Kashpur appeared in Ballad of a Soldier and about 115 other films, with roles ranging from Vladimir Lenin to Baba Yaga. Kashpur was also active in the Moscow Art Theatre.

Selected filmography
 Ballad of a Soldier (1959)
 Time, Forward! (1965)
 No Path Through Fire (1968)
 Liberation (1970)
 Commander of the Happy "Pike" (1972)
 Planet Parade (1984)
 Lev Tolstoy (1984)
 New Adventures of a Yankee in King Arthur's Court (1988)
 Cold Summer of 1953 (1988)
 Taxi Blues (1990)
 Don't Play the Fool (1997)
 Composition for Victory Day (1998)
 The Wedding (2000)
 Bastards (2006)

Awards
 Honored Artist of the RSFSR (1976)
 People's Artist of the RSFSR (1986)
 State Prize of the Russian Federation (2000)
 Order of Honour

Personal life
Wife Lyudmila Grigorievna Kashpur, died in 2009. The couple had a son, Aleksei.

References

External sources 
 
Obituary (in Russian)

1926 births
2009 deaths
People from Klyuchevsky District
Russian male film actors
Soviet male film actors
People's Artists of the RSFSR
Honored Artists of the RSFSR
Recipients of the Order "For Merit to the Fatherland", 3rd class
State Prize of the Russian Federation laureates
Russian male stage actors
Soviet male stage actors
Recipients of the Order of Honour (Russia)
Communist Party of the Soviet Union members
Soviet World War II pilots
Moscow Art Theatre School alumni